Jim Bessman (July 19, 1952 – June 22, 2021) was an American writer and music journalist. He is best known as a music journalist, having written for Billboard Magazine and numerous other publications, liner notes for albums, covering the Songwriters Hall of Fame induction ceremonies, and as an author of "The Ramones – An American Band" and "John Mellencamp – The Concert at Walter Reed".

Bessman was a voting member of the Rock and Roll Hall of Fame.

Early life and education 

Bessman was born July 19, 1952, in Milwaukee, Wisconsin. He grew up in Madison and began writing freelance for Variety while in Wisconsin.

Career 

Bessman relocated to New York to work at Cashbox. He was hired by Timothy White at Billboard to write the Songwriting and Publishing column and continued to contribute stories for over twenty-five years, later preferring to remain freelance. He wrote for Spin, Country Rhythms, CenterlineNews.com, his own website blog and other publications.

Bessman wrote liner notes for over eighty albums. In Ann Powers' New York Times review of Jane Siberry's album "Child", she refers to Bessman's liner notes.

Death 
Bessman died from an aneurysm in Manhattan on June 22, 2021.

Reception
Linda Moran, president of the Songwriters Hall of Fame was quoted as saying "...he was a great historian...he knew hidden facts about everything. He was a great fan of songwriters..."

References

External links
 

1952 births
2021 deaths
American music journalists
Writers from Milwaukee
Writers from Madison, Wisconsin
Journalists from Wisconsin
20th-century American journalists
20th-century American male writers
21st-century American journalists
21st-century American male writers
American male journalists
Deaths from aneurysm
Rock critics